Charles Seife is an American author and journalist, and a professor at New York University. He has written extensively on scientific and mathematical topics.

Career

Seife holds a mathematics degree from Princeton University (1993), an M.S. in mathematics from Yale University and a M.S. in journalism from Columbia University.

Seife wrote for Science magazine and New Scientist before joining the Department of Journalism at New York University where he became a professor.

Books
His first and best-known published book is Zero: The Biography of a Dangerous Idea. One review of this book described it as "one of the best-written popular science books ... for quite a while". Another review, however, said he gave contradictory information within the book as well as belittling the subject of the book as a whole.

Another well-known book from Seife is Proofiness: How You're Being Fooled By the Numbers. Here, Seife focuses on how much propaganda uses numbers worded in such a way that they confuse people and can be misinterpreted.

Other books by Seife are: 
Alpha & Omega: The Search for the Beginning and End of the Universe, Penguin Putnam, 2003. 
Decoding the Universe, Penguin, 2007. 
Sun in a Bottle: The Strange History of Fusion and the Science of Wishful Thinking,  Viking, 2008. 
Virtual Unreality: Just Because the Internet Told You, How Do You Know It's True?, Penguin Putnam, 2014.

Other writing

His freelance work has appeared in The Philadelphia Inquirer, The Washington Post, The New York Times, Scientific American, and The Economist, among others.

Throughout his career, Seife has written many book reviews, especially of books which focus on mathematics.

Professional associations
He is a member of PEN, the National Association of Science Writers, and the D.C. Science Writers Association.

Awards
2001 PEN/Martha Albrand Award for First Nonfiction for Zero: The Biography of a Dangerous Idea

References

External links
Article on edge.org
DC Science Writers Association website
Homepage
Leonard Lopate interview with Charles Seife

American science writers
Mathematics writers
Mathematics popularizers
Year of birth missing (living people)
Living people
Princeton University alumni
Yale University alumni
Columbia University Graduate School of Journalism alumni
New York University faculty
American journalism academics